Hugh Godfrey Maturin Williamson  (born 15 July 1947) is a theologian and academic. He was Regius Professor of Hebrew at the University of Oxford from 1992 to 2014, a position he now holds as Emeritus.

Career

Williamson has authored major commentaries on Ezra/Nehemiah in the Word Biblical Commentary series and a multi-volumed commentary of Isaiah 1-27 for the International Critical Commentary series. For the latter, volume 1 was published in 2006 and volume 2 in 2019.

He has been chairman of the British Academy’s Humanities Group and also chairman of the Anglo-Israel Archaeological Society.

He remains secretary to the executive committee of the Semantics of Ancient Hebrew Database project.

Williamson remains active in his research interests, which include the Book of Isaiah and the Achaemenid Period history and literature.

A festschrift was published in 2012 for H. G. M. Williamson on the occasion of his sixty-fifth birthday.

Honours
He was appointed Officer of the Order of the British Empire (OBE) in the 2015 New Year Honours for services to scholarship and theology.

Works

Books

Chapters

Festschrift

References

External links
 Williamson's Oxford faculty page

1947 births
Fellows of the British Academy
Regius Professors of Hebrew (University of Oxford)
Living people
Old Testament scholars
Officers of the Order of the British Empire
Bible commentators
Presidents of the Society for Old Testament Study